Batomena multispinis is a species of beetle in the family Cerambycidae, and the only species in the genus Batomena. It was described by Bates in 1884.

References

Lamiini
Beetles described in 1884